Vio is a beverage produced by The Coca-Cola Company consisting of milk with flavored carbonated water. The flavors are Citrus Burst, Peach Mango, Very Berry, and Tropical Colada.

The drink was tested on the American market in 2009 but failed to find broad appeal although as of 2010 it was still produced in limited quantities. In 2016, Coca-Cola India launched a non-carbonated flavored milk product also named Vio. The Coca-Cola Company sells a similar product in Japan called Qoo.

Time magazine included Vio in its 50 Worst Inventions list published in 2010 and in its Top 10 Bad Beverage Ideas list.

Relaunch 
In 2020, The Coca-Cola Company has launched regional beverage Spiced Buttermilk under its VIO brand in India.

References

External links

Coca-Cola brands
Milk-based drinks